Seth Wayne Mejias-Brean (born April 5, 1991) is an American former professional baseball infielder. He played in Major League Baseball (MLB) for the San Diego Padres.

Career
Mejias-Brean attended Cienega High School in Pima County, Arizona. Undrafted out of high school, Mejias-Brean attended the University of Arizona, where he played college baseball for the Wildcats. He was a member of the 2012 Arizona Wildcats College World Series championship team. Mejias-Brean was drafted by the Cincinnati Reds in the 8th round, with the 262nd overall selection, of the 2012 MLB draft.

Cincinnati Reds

Mejias-Brean played for the Billings Mustangs in 2012, hitting .313/.389/.536/.925 with 8 home runs and 40 RBI.  He split the 2013 season between the Dayton Dragons and the Bakersfield Blaze, hitting .305/.379/.457/.836 with 11 home runs and 82 RBI. He split the 2014 season between Bakersfield and the Pensacola Blue Wahoos, hitting .270/.368/.406/.774 with 14 home runs and 67 RBI. He returned to Pensacola for the 2015 season, hitting .247/.352/.360/.712 with 6 home runs and 53 RBI. He played for the Louisville Bats in 2016, hitting .228/.290/.315/.605 with 6 home runs and 45 RBI. He returned to Louisville to open the 2017 season.

Seattle Mariners
On May 2, 2017, Mejias-Brean was traded to the Seattle Mariners. He split the season between Louisville, the Arkansas Travelers, and the Tacoma Rainiers, combining to hit .268/.328/.346/.674 with 4 home runs and 50 RBI. He split the 2018 season between Arkansas and Tacoma, hitting .258/.336/.376/.712 with 10 home runs and 57 RBI.

San Diego Padres
Mejias-Brean elected free agency following the 2018 season and signed a minor league contract with the San Diego Padres. He spent the 2019 minor league season with the El Paso Chihuahuas, hitting .316/.367/.455/.822 with 11 home runs and 66 RBI.

On September 3, 2019, the Padres selected Mejias-Brean's contract and promoted him to the major leagues. He made his major league debut on September 4 as a pinch hitter. Mejias-Brean was outrighted off the Padres roster on November 4, 2019 and later became a free agent. However, he re-signed to a minor league deal on November 7, 2019. On August 30, 2020, the Padres released Mejias-Brean.

Baltimore Orioles
On February 3, 2021, Mejias-Brean signed a minor league contract with the Baltimore Orioles organization. Mejias-Brean split the year between the Double-A Bowie Baysox and the Triple-A Norfolk Tides, slashing .234/.321/.390 across 64 games. He was released on August 17, 2021.

Seattle Mariners (second stint)
On December 22, 2021, Mejias-Brean signed a minor league contract with the Seattle Mariners. He elected free agency on November 10, 2022. He reportedly retired on January 4, 2023.

Coaching career
On April 5, 2022, Mejias-Brean was announced as a bench coach for the Seattle Mariners’ Triple-A affiliate, the Tacoma Rainiers, alongside his 2018 Tacoma teammate Zach Vincej.

On January 26, 2023, Mejias-Brean was named the hitting coach for the Single-A Modesto Nuts, with Vincej as the manager, for the 2023 season.

References

External links

 Arizona Wildcats bio
 

1991 births
Living people
Arizona Wildcats baseball players
Arkansas Travelers players
Bakersfield Blaze players
Baseball players from Tucson, Arizona
Billings Mustangs players
Dayton Dragons players
El Paso Chihuahuas players
Major League Baseball infielders
Pensacola Blue Wahoos players
Louisville Bats players
Norfolk Tides players
San Diego Padres players
Surprise Saguaros players
Tacoma Rainiers players
La Crosse Loggers players